Duranbah may refer to:
Duranbah, New South Wales, a town in Tweed Shire, NSW, Australia
Duranbah Beach, a beach 12km from the town